Elachista phragmitella is a moth in the family Elachistidae. It was described by Sruoga in 1992. It is found in Central Asia.

References

Moths described in 1992
phragmitella
Moths of Asia